This is a list of defunct airlines of Cyprus.

See also

 List of airlines of Cyprus
 List of airports in Cyprus

References

Cyprus
Airlines
Airlines, defunct